= Rasuliya Ghat =

- village
- Location within Madhya Pradesh Location within India
- Coordinates: 23.2090412°N 77.244826°E
- Country: India
- State: Madhya Pradesh
- District: Bhopal
- Tehsil: Huzur
- Elevation: 514 m (1,686 ft)

Population (2011)
  - Total: 407
- Time zone: UTC+5:30 (IST)
- ISO 3166 code: MP-IN
- 2011 census code: 482485

Rasuliya Ghat is a village in the Bhopal district of Madhya Pradesh, India. It is located in the Huzur tehsil and the Phanda block.

== Demographics ==
According to the 2011 census of India, Rasuliya Ghat has 84 households. The effective literacy rate (i.e. the literacy rate of population excluding children aged 6 and below) is 68.91%.

Demographics (2011 Census)
	Total	Male	Female
Population	407	189	218
Children aged below 6 years	66	23	43
Scheduled caste	31	15	16
Scheduled tribe	1	0	1
Literates	235	138	97
Workers (all)	221	110	111
Main workers (total)	210	103	107
Main workers: Cultivators	156	75	81
Main workers: Agricultural labourers	49	27	22
Main workers: Household industry workers	0	0	0
Main workers: Other	5	1	4
Marginal workers (total)	11	7	4
Marginal workers: Cultivators	3	2	1
Marginal workers: Agricultural labourers	3	1	2
Marginal workers: Household industry workers	0	0	0
Marginal workers: Others	5	4	1
Non-workers	186	79	107
